Ejup Ganić (born 3 March 1946) is a Bosnian engineer and politician who is the founder and chancellor of Sarajevo School of Science and Technology. 

He served one term as President of the Federation of Bosnia and Herzegovina from 1997 to 2001.
He holds a ScD (doctor of science) from Massachusetts Institute of Technology.

Early life
Ganić was born in Sebečevo village near Novi Pazar municipality in the Sandžak geographical region of Serbia, then Yugoslavia. He is the founder and current president of Sarajevo School of Science and Technology and a regular professor of engineering science at the school.

Political career
During the Bosnian War, he was part of the Presidency of Bosnia and Herzegovina. He was a member of the Party of Democratic Action (SDA; 1990−2000). During the war, the Bosnian government and SDA was divided into two groups, one that looked to the West, and the other, called the Sandžak faction, hardliners that wished to take on all. Another division was between the secularists and conservatists. Ganić was part of the Sandžak faction and conservatists.

During early talks of the partition of Bosnia and Herzegovina, he remarked that the Bosniaks "are Islamized Serbs", and should thus join the Serb side, at a time when the SDA shifted in favour of siding with the Serbs and continuing struggling against the Croats. 

He was President of the Federation of Bosnia and Herzegovina from 1997 to 2001. He also served as the Vice-President of the Federation of Bosnia and Herzegovina 1994-1997.

Education and occupations

Dr. Ganić has a ScD. in Engineering Science from Massachusetts Institute of Technology.

Dr. Ganić also worked as an assistant researcher at Massachusetts Institute of Technology, assistant lecturer at New York University  and University of Chicago,  lecturer at University of Illinois at Chicago, director of UNIS Institute (Sarajevo, Bosnia and Herzegovina) and guest lecturer at Lomonosov Moscow State University.

Dr. Ganić published over one hundred publications, among them books such as Handbook of Heat Transfer Fundamentals, Experimental Heat Transfer and Engineering Turbulence Modelling and Measurements. In 2002, he published a book called Engineering Companion, published by McGraw-Hill. He is a member of the American Nuclear Society and many other professional societies.

Personal life
Ejup Ganić is married and has two children.

Citizenship
Ejup Ganić was a citizen of Serbia by birth. Ganić has been living in Sarajevo, Bosnia and Herzegovina since 1981, and as such is also a citizen of Bosnia since that time.

Arrest and release

On 1 March 2010 Ganić was arrested at Heathrow Airport in London after Serbian judicial authorities issued an extradition warrant. He was accused of conspiracy to murder 40 Yugoslav People's Army (JNA) soldiers in the Dobrovoljačka Street attack in May 1992. He was released on 12 March after Sanela Diana Jenkins had paid his bail. Judge John Laws remarked that the arrest warrant by Serbia was politically motivated and therefore granted Ganić bail. It was also claimed by Ganić's defence lawyers that Serbia had yet to produce any real evidence, and that most of their supposed evidence was made up of news articles regarding the Dobrovoljačka incident. However, the Serbian prosecutor's office claims that the case contains additional evidence. On 27 July 2010, the City of Westminster Magistrates' Court blocked his extradition and released him, the judge saying that he was led to believe the extradition proceedings were "brought and [were] being used for political purposes, and as such amount to an abuse of the process of this court". Marko Attila Hoare, a leading scholarly expert on Bosnian history, wrote this after British authorities detained Ganic: "This incident demonstrates that Serbia is still very far from showing repentance for its aggression against Bosnia during the 1990s. On the contrary, with the arrest of Ganic, Serbia is continuing this aggression, by attempting to persecute Bosnians guilty only of trying to defend their country from it."

References

External links

1946 births
Living people
People from Novi Pazar
Bosniaks of Serbia
Bosniaks of Bosnia and Herzegovina
Presidents of the Federation of Bosnia and Herzegovina
Vice Presidents of the Federation of Bosnia and Herzegovina
Politicians of the Federation of Bosnia and Herzegovina
Politicians of the Bosnian War
University of Belgrade alumni
Academic staff of the University of Sarajevo
Bosnia and Herzegovina diplomats
Party of Democratic Action politicians
Members of the Academy of Sciences and Arts of Bosnia and Herzegovina
Members of the Presidency of Bosnia and Herzegovina
Academic staff of the Sarajevo School of Science and Technology